Jawahir Nathoo Shah (9 April 1942 - 15 September 2019) was an East African cricketer. He played three One Day Internationals in the 1975 World Cup. He was Kenya's leading batsman from the mid 1960s for more than a decade and a half. An attractive batsman with a wide range of strokes, he hit 96 and 134 for Kenya against a strong touring India side which featured Bedi and Prasanna in 1967.

References

1942 births
Living people
East African cricketers
East African cricket captains
East Africa One Day International cricketers
Kenyan cricketers
Cricketers at the 1975 Cricket World Cup